= Sreedhar TN =

Sreedhar Tigala Nayudu
- Born: Andhra Pradesh, India
- Occupations: Film director, writer
- Years active: 2012–present

Sreedhar Tigala Nayudu, simply known and credited as Sridhar TN, is a film director from Andhra Pradesh, India.

== Early life ==
Sreedhar was born in Vizianagaram, Andhra Pradesh, India. His childhood days were spent in Hyderabad. He completed his Master's in Business Administration from Osmania University in 2005.

== Career ==
Sreedhar started working in the film industry from 2012 by releasing his first film Janaaza. The film had to present newcomers as it was on a low scaled budget. The filming completed by the end of 2013 and in 2014, and it had a limited theatrical release.

From September 2016, Sreedhar is working as a director on the pre-production of his second film The Tailgater.

Sreedhar and Shameem Unissa Begum, a 45 year old conservative Muslim housewife got a special mention as their Documentary “MASLAA” (the incident) was India's entry to the Prestigious Documentary Film Festival (Al Jazeera Film Festival) to be held in Doha in 2017.

== Filmography ==
Year	Film	Notes
2014	Janaaza	Debut film
TBA	Tailgater	In production
